The 1909–10 Central University men's basketball team represented Centre College during the 1909–10 college basketball season. The team was led by brothers William and Louis Seelbach, the sons of the man who founded the Seelbach Hotel. The team posted a 20–3 record. The team beat Kentucky 87-17.

References

Centre
Centre Colonels men's basketball seasons